The 1985 Giro di Lombardia was the 79th edition of the Giro di Lombardia cycle race and was held on 12 October 1985. The race started in Como and finished in Milan. The race was won by Sean Kelly of the Skil team.

General classification

Notes

References

1985
Giro di Lombardia
Giro di Lombardia
October 1985 sports events in Europe
1985 Super Prestige Pernod International